"Botti" is an Italian surname can refer to:

 Anna Maria Adorni Botti (1805-1893), Blessed, Italian Roman Catholic widow and then professed religious 
 Chris Botti (b. 1962), American trumpeter and composer.
 Giulia Botti (b. 1980), Italian ski mountaineer
 Gaudenzio Botti (1698–1775), Italian painter 
 Guglielmo Botti (1829-1906), Italian dresser and restorer.
 Ida Botti Scifoni (1812-1844), Italian painter, sculptor and designer
 Marco Botti (b. 1976), Italian racehorse trainer
 Matteo Botti (ca. 1570–1621), Italian scientific instrument maker
 Raphael Jose Botti (b. 1981), Brazilian professional footballer
 Rinaldo Botti (1658-1740), Italian painter active in the Baroque period
 Villana de' Botti T.O.S.D. (1332-1361), Blessed, Italian Roman Catholic professed religious
 Alicia Botti, human character in Thomas & Friends